Gao Zengxiang (Chinese:高增翔; Pinyin: Gāo Zēngxiáng; born 21 December 1989 in Shenyang) is a Chinese football player who currently plays for China League One side Nei Mongol Zhongyou.

Club career
Gao joined Changsha Ginde youth team system in the early year and was promoted to first team squad in 2009. On 14 July 2010, he made his Super League debut in a 2–0 away defeat against Henan Construction, coming on as a substitute for Wang Bin in the 67th minute. He played 13 league matches in the 2010 league season, all came on from the bench, as Changsha Ginde finished the bottom of the league and relegation to China League One. In February 2011, the club moved to Shenzhen as the club's name changed into Shenzhen Phoenix. After refusing to have a trial in Hunan Billows, Gao chose to stay in the club. The club were bought by Chinese property developers Guangzhou R&F and moved to Guangzhou in June 2011 and won promotion back to the Super League at the first attempt. However, it was not a successful season for Gao, he made just 6 appearances in the league, all coming on as a substitute. In 2012, after Brazilian manager Sérgio Farias took charge of the club, Gao became a regular starter. He made his first league start on 10 March 2012, in a 3–1 home victory against Beijing Guoan.

On 19 February 2014, Gao transferred to China League One side Shijiazhuang Yongchan. On 27 February 2014, Gao transferred to Nei Mongol Zhongyou.

Career statistics 
Statistics accurate as of match played 31 December 2019.

References

External links
 

1989 births
Living people
Chinese footballers
Association football midfielders
Footballers from Shenyang
Changsha Ginde players
Guangzhou City F.C. players
Cangzhou Mighty Lions F.C. players
Inner Mongolia Zhongyou F.C. players
Chinese Super League players
China League One players
21st-century Chinese people